"That Old Feeling" is a popular song about nostalgia written by Sammy Fain, with lyrics by Lew Brown. It was published in 1937.

The song first appeared in the movie Walter Wanger's Vogues of 1938, but it was actually released in 1937. Sung there by Virginia Verrill, it was nominated for the Academy Award for Best Original Song in 1937 but lost out to "Sweet Leilani".

The song was immediately a hit in a version recorded by Shep Fields and His Rippling Rhythm Orchestra, considered to have spent fourteen weeks on the charts in 1937, four at #1. (The charts did not actually exist in those days, but reconstructions of what they would have been give those statistics.) A version was also recorded by Jan Garber, which charted at #10.)

In 1952, it was included in the Susan Hayward movie, With a Song in My Heart where Jane Froman sang it in a dubbing for Hayward.
Patti Page, as well as Frankie Laine and Buck Clayton, had hit versions of the song in 1955.

Betty Hutton sang it in Spring Reunion (1957). Frank Sinatra had a hit with the song in 1960 from the album Nice 'n' Easy.

The song is also featured in the 1981 film, Body Heat, played at an outdoor summer concert by a big band on stage.

In the 1971 novel Summer of '42 by Herman Raucher, the song is prominent in chapter 19.  That's when the main character, Hermie, visits Dorothy shortly after she has received the news of her husband's death in World War II.  The song clearly was the favorite of Dorothy and her husband, and she dances with Hermie as the phonograph record plays.

The title of the song was given to a film in 1997, starring Bette Midler and Dennis Farina, where it was performed by Patrick Williams and by Louis Armstrong and Oscar Peterson.

Recorded versions

George Adams
Ray Anthony
Louis Armstrong
Randy Bachman
Chet Baker
Count Basie
Tex Beneke
Brook Benton
Art Blakey and the Jazz Messengers
Connee Boswell
Elkie Brooks
Dave Brubeck
Rosemary Clooney
Ray Conniff
Chick Corea
Dorothy Dandridge
Doris Day
Buddy DeFranco
Paul Desmond
Dreamland Faces
Bob Dylan (2017 Triplicate)
Billy Eckstine
Sammy Fain
Gracie Fields
Shep Fields
Eddie Fisher with Hugo Winterhalter and his orchestra. Recorded at Manhattan Center, New York City, on July 1, 1952. It was released by RCA Victor Records as catalog number 20-4842A (in USA) and by EMI on the His Master's Voice label as catalog number B 10638
Ella Fitzgerald on her Decca album "For Sentimental Reasons"
The Four Lads
Jane Froman
Judy Garland
Erroll Garner
Stan Getz
Buddy Greco
Adelaide Hall
Woody Herman
Al Hirt
Leslie Hutchinson
Frank Ifield
Harry James
Joni James
Kitty Kallen
Stan Kenton
Teddi King
King's Singers
Diana Krall
Cleo Laine
Frankie Laine
Mina
Dorothy Lamour
Steve Lawrence
Peggy Lee
Guy Lombardo and his Royal Canadians
Julie London - London by Night (1958)
Joe Loss and his band
Vera Lynn
Ethel Merman
James Morrison (instrumental only)
Anita O'Day
Patti Page
Emma Pask
Les Paul and Mary Ford
The Platters
Martha Raye
Della Reese
Joan Regan
Harry Roy
Lita Roza
Linda Scott
Artie Shaw
Dinah Shore
Frank Sinatra - Nice 'n' Easy (1960)
Rod Stewart
Maxine Sullivan
Art Tatum
Claude Thornhill
Tiny Tim on his 1996 album Girl, his last album
Mel Tormé
Miyoshi Umeki
Fats Waller
Dinah Washington
Magni Wentzel with Einar Iversen, trumpet, Endre Iversen, piano, Tor Braun, guitar, Erik Amundsen, bass. Recorded on May 2, 1960. Released on the single Odeon ND 7373.
Andy Williams
Nancy Wilson

References

1937 songs
Songs about nostalgia
Pop standards
Songs written for films
Songs with music by Sammy Fain
Songs with lyrics by Lew Brown
Lena Horne songs
Doris Day songs
Dorothy Lamour songs
Frank Sinatra songs
Patti Page songs
Al Hirt songs
Andy Williams songs
Linda Scott songs